The following is about the qualification rules and allocation of spots for the figure skating events at the 2018 Winter Olympics.

Qualification system 
A total of 148 quota spots are available to athletes to compete at the games. A maximum of 18 athletes can be entered by a National Olympic Committee, with a maximum of 9 men or 9 women. A further ten team trophy quotas can be distributed to countries qualifying for the team event, but not the discipline itself. This means up to a maximum of 158 athletes can partake.  If these additional ten quotas are not used, then the host (South Korea) may use them to qualify for each event, but may not qualify for the team event by use of these additional quotas.

Skater qualification 
There is no individual athlete qualification to the Olympics; the choice of which athlete(s) to send to the Games is at the discretion of each country's National Olympic Committee. Each country is allowed a maximum of three entries per discipline, resulting in a maximum of 18 athletes (nine men and nine women) possible per country.

According to ISU rules, countries must select their entries from among skaters who have achieved a minimum technical elements score (TES) at an ISU-recognized international competition on or before 29 January 2018.

Country qualification 
The number of entries for the figure skating events at the Olympic Games is limited by a quota set by the International Olympic Committee. A total of 148 quota spots are available to athletes to compete at the games. There will be 30 skaters in the disciplines of men's and ladies' singles, 20 pair skating teams, and 24 ice dance teams. Additionally, ten nations qualified for the team event.

Countries were able to qualify entries to the 2018 Winter Olympics in two ways. Most spots were allocated based on the results of the 2017 World Championships. At the event, countries were able to qualify up to three entries in each discipline according to the usual system in place; countries which earned multiple spots to the Olympics also earned multiple spots to the 2018 World Championships. Every discipline qualified separately.

At the World Championships, the system was as follows:

according to rule 378(2) of ISU any competitor who failed to qualify for the free program received a maximum placement score of 18, and any competitor who qualified for the free program received a maximum placement score of 16.

Qualification spots available per tournament 
The results of the 2017 World Championships determined 83 total spots: 24 entries in each singles discipline, 16 in pairs, and 19 in ice dance. The available spots were awarded going down the results list, with multiple spots being awarded first.

The remainder of the spots were filled at the Nebelhorn Trophy in Oberstdorf, Germany in late September 2017. Countries which had already earned an entry to the Olympics were not allowed to qualify more entries at this final qualifying competition. Unlike at the World Championships, where countries could qualify more than one spot depending on the placement of the skater, at this ISU competition countries could earn only one spot per discipline, regardless of placement. Initially, a total of six spots per singles event, four spots in pairs, and five in ice dance were available at the ISU competition.

If a country declines to use one or more of its qualified spots, the vacated spot is awarded using the results of the ISU competition in descending order of placement. By the time the ISU competition was held, one more spot in pairs and one more spot in ice dance became available according to this rule.

For the team trophy, scores from the 2016–17 championship season and the 2017–18 grand prix season, were tabulated to establish the ten top nations. Each nation compiled a score from their top performers in each of the four disciplines. The Grand Prix Final, taking place in early December 2017, was the final event to affect the Team Trophy score.

Qualification timeline

Qualified countries

Qualification summary

Men's singles 

 Swedish Olympic Committee decided to return their quota spot, as Swedish figure skater Alexander Majorov was unable to achieve the 258 point total score required by the Swedish Olympic Committee. Philippines received the quota spot.

Ladies' singles

Pairs 

The USA pairs entries did achieve the requisite 28 placement points to have two entries, however only receive one entry because the total number of qualifiers from the World Championship exceeded sixteen, and they were the last ISU member to reach the qualifying limit (rule 400.A.3)
France withdrew its second pairs spot making 5 spots available at the Nebelhorn Trophy.
North Korea originally missed the deadline to submit entries and was replaced by the first alternate, Japan. However, following negotiations with South Korea, the North Koreans agreed to send the athletes after all and IOC agreed to extend the deadline. ISU clarified that North Korea's quota place has been given to Japan and that an additional entry in to the competition is up to IOC.

Ice dance 

 Denmark earned a spot through the 2017 World Figure Skating Championships, however they relinquished their allocation because Laurence Fournier Beaudry was unable to obtain clearance to participate for Denmark.

Team event 
Final standings.

Next eligible NOC per event 
If a country rejects a quota spot then additional quotas become available. A country can be eligible for one quota spot per event in the reallocation process. Countries in bold indicate the country later received a quota spot. The following list is compiled after the remaining spots were allocated at the 2017 CS Nebelhorn Trophy.

References

Citations

External links 
ISU communication 2119 listing official entries

Qualification
Qualification for the 2018 Winter Olympics